m The LXIX Army Corps, initially known as the LXIX Reserve Corps, was an army corps of the German Wehrmacht during World War II. The corps was initially formed in July 1943.

History 
The LXIX Reserve Corps was formed on 8 July 1943 for deployment in occupied Yugoslavia. It was deployed under the supervision of the German commander in Croatia (16 November 1942 to 24 August 1943: Rudolf Lüters), stationed in Banja Luka. The initial commander of the LXIX Reserve Corps was the Ernst Dehner.

The LXIX Reserve Corps was part of the 2nd Panzer Army under Army Group F between September 1943 and December 1944 and carried the name LXIX. Armeekorps after 20 January 1944. Dehner was succeeded as corps commander by Julius Ringel on 1 April 1944, who was in turn replaced by Helge Auleb on 24 June 1944. The corps then served in the reserves of Army Group F between January and March 1945 and then in the reserves of Army Group E until the end of the war in May 1945.

Structure

Noteworthy individuals 

 Ernst Dehner, corps commander of LXIX Reserve Corps and LXIX Army Corps (15 July 1943 – 1 April 1944).
 Julius Ringel, corps commander of LXIX Army Corps (1 April 1944 – 24 June 1944).
 Helge Auleb, corps commander of LXIX Army Corps (24 June 1944 – 8 May 1945).

References 

Corps of Germany in World War II
Military units and formations established in 1943
Military units and formations disestablished in 1945